Juan Cedrés Cabrera (15 August 1927 – 3 April 1979) was a Spanish professional footballer who played as a forward.

Playing career
Born in Las Palmas, he played for Las Palmas, Real Madrid, Lleida, Badajoz and Eldense.

Personal life
His brothers Antonio, Domingo and Feluco were also footballers.

References

1927 births
1979 deaths
Spanish footballers
UD Las Palmas players
Real Madrid CF players
UE Lleida players
CD Badajoz players
CD Eldense footballers
La Liga players
Segunda División players
Association football forwards